Gach-e Olya (also Romanized as Gach-e ‘Olyā and Gach ‘Olyā; also known as Gach-e Bālā) is a village in Horjand Rural District, Kuhsaran District, Ravar County, Kerman Province, Iran. At the 2006 census, its population was 113, in 30 families.

References 

Populated places in Ravar County